La Doré (known as Notre-Dame-de-la-Doré before 1983) is a parish municipality in Quebec, Canada, in the regional county municipality of Le Domaine-du-Roy and the administrative region of Saguenay–Lac-Saint-Jean.

It is located along the banks of the Sauger River (Rivière au Doré), between the Ashuapmushuan River and the Laurentian Mountains to the south, in the geographic township of Dufferin.

History

In 1882, the Mission of Notre-Dame-de-la-Visitation-de-la-Doré was established. The village got its real start in 1889 when settlers from Saint-Méthode, Saint-Félicien, Saint-Prime, and Lambton settled there and founded the Colony of Rivière-au-Doré. In 1891, it was for a large part destroyed by fire, but was rebuilt due to the courage and determination of the pioneers. The next year the Rivière-au-Doré Post Office opened.

In 1904, the mission gained the status of parish, and two years later in 1906, it was incorporated as the Parish Municipality of Saint-Félicien-Partie-Nord-Ouest. In 1915, it changed its name to Notre-Dame-de-la-Doré, and in 1983, it was changed again to the abbreviated form La Doré, because of its widespread common use.

Demographics 

Population trend:
 Population in 2011: 1453 (2006 to 2011 population change: -0.1%)
 Population in 2006: 1454
 Population in 2001: 1553
 Population in 1996: 1624
 Population in 1991: 1668

Mother tongue:
 English as first language: 0%
 French as first language: 100%
 English and French as first language: 0%
 Other as first language: 0%

Festivals
La Doré holds an annual truck festival, the Festival des camionneurs de La Doré, which took place for the first time in the summer of 1981. In 1991, the festival organizers decided to establish a snowmobile festival in January, the Rally des Loups de La Doré, which is now a snow-cross competition sanctioned by the SCM.

Sawmill
The municipality also includes one of the oldest water-powered sawmills still operating in Quebec. The Moulin des Pionniers, from circa 1904, is a major tourist attraction and historic site for the village and region.

References

External links

 Municipalité de La Doré
 Moulin des Pionniers
 festival des camionneurs

Incorporated places in Saguenay–Lac-Saint-Jean
Parish municipalities in Quebec
1889 establishments in Quebec